The 2019 Women's South American Volleyball Club Championship is the eleventh official edition of the Women's South American Volleyball Club Championship, played by five teams from February, 19 to February 23, 2019, in Belo Horizonte, Minas Gerais, Brazil.

Minas Tênis Clube won its second consecutive and overall title, and qualified for the 2019 FIVB Volleyball Women's Club World Championship. The Brazilian middle blocker Carol Gattaz was elected the competition MVP.

Pools composition

Venue

All the matches were played at the Arena Minas in Belo Horizonte, Brazil.

Round-robin pool
All times are Brasília Time (UTC−03:00).

|}

|}

Final standing

All-Star team
The following players were chosen for the tournament's "All-Star team":

Most Valuable Player
 Carol Gattaz (Minas Tênis Clube)
Best Opposite
 Bruna da Silva (Minas Tênis Clube)
Best Outside Hitters
 Fernanda Garay (Praia Clube)
 Gabriela Guimarães (Minas Tênis Clube)

Best Setter
 Macris Carneiro (Minas Tênis Clube)
Best Middle Blockers
 Fabiana Claudino (Praia Clube)
 Bianca Farriol (San Lorenzo)
Best Libero
 Léia Silva (Minas Tênis Clube)

See also

2019 Men's South American Volleyball Club Championship

References

External links
CSV

Volleyball
Women's South American Volleyball Club Championship
Volleyball
Women's South American Volleyball Club Championship
Sport in Minas Gerais
Women's South American Volleyball Club Championship